Ede Flórián Birly (1787–1854) was Professor of Theoretical and Practical Obstetrics at the University of Pest. He was one of Semmelweis's principal opponents.

References

1787 births
1854 deaths